Going Inside a Storm is a 1966 Soviet drama film directed by Sergei Mikaelyan. It was based on the novel by Daniil Granin, who also wrote a screenplay together with Mikaelyan.

Plot summary
Protagonists, Sergei Krylov (Aleksandr Belyavskiy) and Oleg Tulin (Vasili Lanovoy), are promising young physicists in the field of thunderstorms. They dream of weather control. But later their ways in science parted - Oleg is ready to tradeoff his standpoints for personal success, but Sergei knows that the truth is more critical.

Cast
 Aleksandr Belyavskiy as Sergei Krylov
 Vasili Lanovoy as Oleg Tulin
 Rostislav Plyatt as Dankevich
 Mikhail Astangov as Golitsin
 Zhanna Prokhorenko as Lena
 Viktoriya Lepko as Zhenya
 Anatoli Papanov as Anykeyev
 Yevgeni Lebedev as Agatov
 Lev Prygunov as Richard
 Leonid Dyachkov as Poltavskiy
 Iosif Konopatsky as Savushkin
 Fyodor Korchagin as Lagunov
 Anatoli Abramov
 Pavel Luspekayev
 Vladimir Treshchalov as Lena's husband

Television version
In 1987 Bulat Mansurov directed a color television version of this film, released by Mosfilm under the name Defeat in 4 series. Total runtime - 362 min. Starring - Igor Volkov, Andrey Teneta, Vasily Lanovoy, Pavel Kadochnikov, Tatiana Plotnikova, Irina Klimova, Leonid Kuravlyov, Olga Kabo, Lev Prygunov.

External links

1966 drama films
1966 films
Soviet drama films
Russian drama films
Soviet black-and-white films
Lenfilm films
Studio Ekran films
Films directed by Sergei Mikaelyan
Films about scientists
Russian black-and-white films